The Hezbollah fraction was the conservative parliamentary group in the Iranian Parliament between 1996 and 2000.

Its leader was Ali-Akbar Hosseini.

Political position 
The group was formed as a countermove to establishment of the 'Hezbollah Assembly', its main rival parliamentary group.

Its members had been contested in the elections while included in the electoral list of the Combatant Clergy Association (CCA). Formed by the "traditionalist right", CCA members shaped core of the fraction. Islamic Coalition Party and Islamic Society of Engineers were other prominent parties in the group.

References 

Iranian Parliament fractions
1996 establishments in Iran
2000 disestablishments in Iran
5th legislature of the Islamic Republic of Iran